Paracetopsis atahualpa is a species of whale catfish of the family Cetopsidae. It is found in Peru and Ecuador where it occurs in the Tumbes River basin (northwestern Peru) and the adjoining upper reaches of the Zarumilla River (southwestern Ecuador).

References 
 

Cetopsidae
Fish described in 2005
Fish of South America
Freshwater fish of Peru
Freshwater fish of Ecuador